Ponometia fasciatella is a moth of the family Noctuidae. It is found from South Carolina, south to Florida, west to Texas.

The wingspan is about 17 mm.

External links
Images
Bug Guide

Acontiinae
Moths of North America
Moths described in 1875